The Madagascar Davis Cup team represents Madagascar in Davis Cup tennis competition and are governed by the Fédération Malgache de Tennis. They have not competed since 2019.

They finished 4th in Group III in 2001 and 2002.

History
Madagascar competed in its first Davis Cup in 1997.

Last team (2019) 

 Jean-Jacques Rakotohasy
 Antso Rakotondramanga (Captain-player)
 Lucas Andriamasilalao
 Toky Ranaivo

See also
Davis Cup
Madagascar Fed Cup team

External links

Davis Cup teams
Davis Cup
Davis Cup